Robert Elledy Gable (born February 20, 1934) is an American businessman from Frankfort, who was the Kentucky Republican gubernatorial nominee in 1975. Gable lost to the incumbent Democratic Governor Julian Carroll. Carroll received 470,159 votes (62.8 percent) to Gable's 277,998 (37.2 percent).

In 1995, Gable again sought the governor's office but lost by a large margin in the Republican primary. With Shirley W. Palmer-Ball, his 1975 running mate reprising that role, Gable lost the primary with 17,054 votes (14.5 percent) to Larry Forgy and Tom Handy's 97,099 votes (82.4 percent). Forgy, as the Republican nominee, was then defeated in the general election by Democrat Paul E. Patton.

Gable formerly resided in Stearns in McCreary County in south Kentucky. Gable is the great-grandson of Justus S. Stearns, founder and owner of Stearns Coal and Lumber Company. He, along with his wife, Emily T. Gable, and family, moved in 1968 to serve as Parks Commissioner in the administration of Governor Louie Nunn. He was a chairman of the Kentucky Republican Party.

In 2008, Gable was an at-large elector for the McCain/Palin ticket, which won a majority in Kentucky.

References

1934 births
Living people
Businesspeople from Kentucky
Businesspeople from New York City
Kentucky Republicans
People from McCreary County, Kentucky
Politicians from Frankfort, Kentucky
Politicians from New York City
Stanford University alumni
2008 United States presidential electors
20th-century American businesspeople